Heo Jung-eun (born September 14, 2007) is a South Korean actress. She first drew public attention with her performances in hit dramas, My Lawyer, Mr. Jo (2016) and Love in the Moonlight (2016). At age nine, she took on her first leading role in television as Geum-bi, a girl who has childhood Niemann–Pick disease in My Fair Lady (2016).

Filmography

Film

Television series

Discography

Soundtrack

Awards and nominations

References

External links
 Heo Jung-eun at Rising Star Entertainment 
 

2007 births
Living people
South Korean child actresses
South Korean television actresses
South Korean film actresses
21st-century South Korean actresses